Watson's Crossing Halt was a halt on the Rishworth Branch, in West Yorkshire, England built by the Lancashire & Yorkshire Railway. It was located just west of Watson Mill Lane, named after a nearby woollen mill.

History
The halt was opened to serve the new motor railcar service in 1907 which was introduced on this line and the neighbouring Stainland Branch in response to growing competition from trams. When open, services ran to  heading north, and to  heading south.

Route

References

Disused railway stations in Calderdale
Former Lancashire and Yorkshire Railway stations
Railway stations in Great Britain opened in 1907
Railway stations in Great Britain closed in 1929
Sowerby Bridge